Northern Italy (or just ) is a geographical and cultural region in the northern part of Italy. It consists of eight administrative regions: Aosta Valley, Piedmont, Liguria, Lombardy, Emilia-Romagna, Veneto, Friuli-Venezia Giulia and Trentino-Alto Adige. As of 2014, its population was 27,801,460. Rhaeto-Romance and Gallo-Italic languages are spoken in the region, as opposed to the Italo-Dalmatian languages spoken in the rest of Italy. The Venetian language is sometimes considered to be part of the Italo-Dalmatian languages, but some major publications such as Ethnologue (to which UNESCO refers on its page about endangered languages) and Glottolog define it as Gallo-Italic.

For statistic purposes, the Istituto Nazionale di Statistica (ISTAT) uses the terms Northwest Italy and Northeast Italy for two of Italy's five statistical regions in its reporting. These same subdivisions are used to demarcate first-level Nomenclature of Territorial Units for Statistics (NUTS) regions ("NUTS 1 regions") within the European Union, and the Italian constituencies for the European Parliament.

Name 
Northern Italy was called by different terms in different periods of history. During ancient times the terms Gallia Cisalpina, Gallia Citerior or Gallia Togata were used to define that part of Italy inhabited by Celts (Gauls) between the 4th and 3rd century BC. Conquered by the Roman Republic in the 220s BC, it was a Roman province from c. 81 BC until 42 BC, when it was merged into Roman Italy. Until that time, it was considered part of Gaul, precisely that part of Gaul on the "hither side of the Alps" (from the perspective of the Romans), as opposed to Transalpine Gaul ("on the far side of the Alps").

After the fall of the Roman Empire and the settlement of the Lombards the name Langobardia Maior was used, in the Early Middle Ages, to define the domains of the Lombard Kingdom in Northern Italy. The Lombard territories beyond were called Langobardia Minor, consisting of the duchies of Spoleto and Benevento.

During the Late Middle Ages, after the fall of the northern part of the Lombard Kingdom to Charlemagne, the term Longobardia was used to mean Northern Italy within the medieval Kingdom of Italy. As the area became partitioned in regional states the term Lombardy subsequentially shifted to indicate only the area of the Duchies of Milan, Mantua, Parma and Modena and later only to the area around Milan.

During the late modern period, the term Alta Italia ('High Italy') was widely used, for such by the Comitato di Liberazione Nazionale Alta Italia during the second World War. In the 1960s, the term Padania began to be sometimes used as geographical synonym of the Po Valley. The term appeared sparingly until the early 1990s, when Lega Nord, a federalist and at times separatist political party in Italy, proposed Padania as a possible name for an independent state in Northern Italy. Since then, the term has carried strong political connotations.

History

Antiquity and Early Middle Ages

In pre-Roman centuries it was inhabited by different peoples among whom the Ligures, the ancient Veneti, who prospered through their trade in amber and breeding of horses, the Etruscans, attested in Northern Italy at least since the early Iron Age during the Villanova period, founded the city of Bologna and spread the use of writing; later, starting from the 5th century BC, the area was invaded by Celtic – Gallic tribes. These people founded several cities like Turin and Milan and extended their rule from the Alps to the Adriatic Sea. Their development was halted by the Roman expansion in the Po Valley from the 3rd century BC onwards. After centuries of struggle, in 194 BC the entire area of what is now Northern Italy became a Roman province with the name of Gallia Cisalpina ("Gaul on the inner side (with respect to Rome) of the Alps"). The Roman culture and language overwhelmed the former civilization in the following years, and Northern Italy became one of the most developed and rich areas of the western half of the empire with the construction of a wide array of roads and the development of agriculture and trade.

In late antiquity the strategic role of Northern Italy was emphasized by the moving of the capital of the Western Empire from Rome to Mediolanum in 286 and later to Ravenna from 402 until the empire collapsed in 476.

After the fall of the Western Empire, Northern Italy suffered heavily from destruction brought about by migration from Germanic peoples. In 493 the Ostrogoths managed to create a stable and prosperous kingdom, with its capital first in Ravenna and then in Pavia, but the Gothic War caused the kingdom to fall and devastated the region. In the 570s the Germanic Lombards, or Longobardi, entered Northern Italy from Friuli and founded a long-lasting reign (with its capital in Pavia) that gave the medieval name to the whole Northern Italy and the current name to the Lombardy region.
After the initial struggles, relationships between the Lombard people and the Latin-speaking people improved. In the end, the Lombard language and culture assimilated with the Latin culture, leaving evidence in many names, the legal code and laws, and other things. The end of Lombard rule came in 774, when the Frankish king Charlemagne conquered Pavia, deposed Desiderius, the last Lombard king, and annexed the Lombard Kingdom to his empire changing the name in Kingdom of Italy. The former Lombard dukes were mostly replaced by Frankish counts, prince-bishops or marquises.

High Middle Age and Renaissance

In the 10th century, North Italy, although formally under the rule of the Holy Roman Empire, being included in the kingdom of Italy, of which Pavia remained the capital until 1024, however, gradually, starting from the last decades of the 11th century was in fact divided in a multiplicity of small, autonomous city-states, the medieval communes and maritime republic. The 11th century marked a significant boom in Northern Italy's economy, due to improved trading and agricultural innovations, culture flourished as well with many universities founded, among them the University of Bologna, the oldest university in Europe.
The increasing richness of the city-states made them able to defy the traditional feudal supreme power, represented by the German emperors and their local vassals. This process led to the creation of different Lombard Leagues formed by allied cities of Lombardy that defeated the Hohenstaufen Emperor Frederick I, at Legnano, and his grandson Frederick II, at Parma, and becoming virtually independent from the German emperors.
The Leagues failed to develop from an alliance to a lasting confederation and subsequently, among the various local city-states, a process of consolidation took place; most of them became lordships ruled by powerful families like the Della Scala of Verona or the Visconti of Milan, and conquered neighboring cities threatening to unify Northern Italy under a single state. In the end a balance of power was reached in 1454 with the Peace of Lodi and Northern Italy ended up divided between a small number of regional states, the most powerful were the Duchies of Savoy, Milan, Mantua, Ferrara and the Republics of Genoa and Venice, which had begun to extend its influence in the mainland from the 14th century onwards.

In the 15th century Northern Italy became one of the centres of the Renaissance whose culture and works of art were highly regarded. The enterprising class of the communes extended its trade and banking activities well into northern Europe and "Lombards", the term that designated the merchants or bankers coming from northern Italy, were present in all of Europe.
The Italian Wars between 1494 and 1559 ended the North Italian Renaissance and brought the region to be fought between France and the Spanish and Austrian House of Habsburg. After the decisive Battle of Pavia, most of the present-day Lombardy became under direct or indirect control of Spain.
At the same time Ottoman control of the eastern Mediterranean and the discoveries of sea routes to Asia around Africa and of the Americas led to the decline of the Venetian Republic. While the Republic of Genoa managed to become the main banking base of the Spanish Empire.

Pestilences, like that of 1628/1630, and the generally declining conditions of Italy's economy in the 17th and 18th centuries halted the further development of Northern Italy. The only polity that managed to thrive in this period was the Savoy's state which, thanks to military and diplomatic victories in 1720, managed to acquire the island of Sardinia, through which the then Dukes gained legitimacy as a proper Kingdom and increased Turin's importance as a European capital.

Modern history

After the French Revolution in the late 18th century Northern Italy was conquered by the French armies, many client republics were created by Napoleon and in 1805 a new Kingdom of Italy, made of all of Northern Italy but Piedmont that was annexed to France, was established with Milan as capital and Napoleon as head of state.
In the congress of Vienna, the Kingdom of Sardinia was restored, and furthermore enlarged by annexing the Republic of Genoa to strengthen it as a barrier against France. The rest of Northern Italy was under Austrian rule, either direct like in the Lombardo-Venetian Kingdom or indirect like in the Duchies of Parma and Modena. Bologna and Romagna were given to the Papal State.
The Austrian imperial government was unpopular because of their anti-liberal politics and Northern Italy became the intellectual centre leading the Italian unification process. Piedmont and the Kingdom of Sardinia, in particular, was the state that launched Italy's unification in 1859–1861. After defeating the Austrians in 1859 and annexing Northern Italy the new state proceeded to launch a campaign to conquer Southern and Central Italy and Turin briefly became the capital of the almost whole of Italy. 

After Italian unification the capital was moved from Turin to Rome and the administrative and institutional importance of Northern Italy was substantially reduced. However, from the late 19th century and especially with the economic boom of the 1950s–1960s, Northern Italy and especially the cities of Turin, Genoa, and Milan was the most important region in the Italian industrialization and sharpened its status of richest and most industrialized part of Italy.

Between 1943 and 1945, during the Second World War, Northern Italy was part of the Fascist Italian Social Republic and the main theatre of the anti-fascist partisan activity. Between April 19 and 25, 1945 the cities of Northern Italy began an insurrection against Fascist and Nazist forces that led to the liberation of Northern Italy by Allied forces. Economic differences between Northern Italy and the rest of the country, as well as the short history of Italy as a single nation, led in the 1990s to the emergence of Padanian nationalism, as Lega Nord promoted either secession or larger autonomy for Padania, the name chosen to represent Northern Italy.

Geography

Northern Italy is made of the basin of the River Po, which comprises the whole of the broad plain extending from the foot of the Apennines to that of the Alps, together with the valleys and slopes on both sides of it, the Venetian Plain and the Ligurian coast.
Northern Italy has the Alps as northern and western boundary and the Apennine Mountains as the southern one. In between the two mountain ranges lies a large plain made of the Venetian Plain and the valley of the Po, the largest river in Italy, which flows  eastward from the Cottian Alps to the Adriatic Sea and receives all the waters that flow from the Apennines northwards, and all those that descend from the Alps towards the south. The Po Valley is the largest plain in Italy and held the vast majority of North Italian population.

The Alps are home to some worldwide-known mountains like the Matterhorn (Cervino), Monte Rosa, Gran Paradiso in the western Alps, and Bernina, Stelvio and Dolomites along the eastern side of the Alps.

With the exception of part of Liguria all of Northern Italy lies in the drainage basin of the Adriatic Sea (with rivers Po, Piave, Adige, Brenta, Tagliamento, Reno) though the waters from some border municipalities (Livigno in Lombardy, Innichen and Sexten in Trentino-Alto Adige/Südtirol) drain into the Black Sea through the basin of the Danube, and the waters from the Lago di Lei in Lombardy drain into the North Sea through the basin of the Rhine.

On the foothills of the Alps there are a number of subalpine moraine-dammed lakes, the largest of which is Garda. Other well known of these subalpine lakes are Lake Maggiore, whose most northerly section is part of Switzerland, Como, Orta, Lugano, Iseo, Idro.

Climate

The climate of Northern Italy is mainly humid subtropical (Köppen Cfa), especially in the plains. Winter in Northern Italy is normally long, relatively dry and rather cold. In addition, there is a high seasonal temperature variation between summer and winter. In the hills and mountains, the climate is humid continental (Köppen Dfb). In the valleys it is cold but usually with low humidity, while it can be severely cold above , with copious snowfalls. The coastal areas of Liguria generally fit the Mediterranean climate profile. In the Alpine foothills, characterised by an Oceanic climate (Köppen Cfb), numerous lakes exercise a mitigating influence, allowing the cultivation of typically Mediterranean crops (olives, citrus fruit).

A peculiarity of the regional climate is the thick fog that covers the plains between October and February, especially in the central Po Plain. The east coast, from Romagna to Trieste is occasionally affected by the cold bora winds in winter and spring.

Summer is usually more stable, although quite stormy near the Alps, with July temperatures in the range  near the Alps or by the sea, like in Milan or Venice, whereas in southern Po plain  can be reached, like in Bologna.

The number of days with lows below  is usually from 60 to 90 a year, with peaks of 100–110 days in the mainly rural zones. In the colder winters, the Venice Lagoon may freeze, and in the coldest ones even enough to walk on the ice sheet.

Precipitation is evenly distributed during the year, more abundant in spring and autumn at low altitudes and in summer at high elevations; it is more intense in the Prealpine zone, up to  annually, but is abundant also in the plains and Alpine zones, with an average of  annually. The total annual rainfall is on average . Snow is quite common between early December and early March in cities like Turin, Milan and Bologna, but sometimes it appears in late November or late March and even April.

Pollution
Because of high industrialization and the lack of wind due to being closed between mountain ranges air pollution remains a severe problem in Northern Italy. Even if smog levels have decreased dramatically since the 1970s and 1980s, in 2005 a team of researchers at the Royal Netherlands Meteorological Institute reported that Northern Italy was one of Europe's most polluted areas in terms of smog and air pollution due to its climatic and geographic conditions, which cause the stagnation of pollutants.

In March 2019, the European Space Agency (ESA) published images took from their satellites. These images show a big stain, made of nitrogen dioxide and fine particles, situated above the Po Valley area, which incorporates the city of Milan, Turin, and Bologna. Milan and Turin share high levels of ozone and nitrogen oxides, which are mainly produced by cars diesel and petrol engines. The big stain analyzed by ESA is the main reason why Po valley air pollution levels are so high it is considered nowadays the worst area in Europe for air quality. To shed light on how dangerous it is for humans to live in polluted environments, Chicago Energy Policy Institute has recently developed the Air Quality Life Index (AQLI), a system capable of analyzing air pollution worldwide. According to AQLI findings, Po valley air pollution affects inhabitants so hard that it cuts off about half a year of their life expectancy. The main reasons why there's a big stain of air pollution over the Po valley are strictly connected to livestock and factories. The so-called "NPK fertilizers", made of nitrogen, phosphorus and potassium, along with manure emissions from intensive breeding and high levels of nitrogen dioxide released by diesel and petrol engines are all accountable for this disastrous air condition in Northern Italy. The region of Lombardy produces also vast amounts of animal waste, a big contributor to pollution. It delivers more than 40 percent of Italy's milk production, for example, while over half of the Italian pig production is located in the Po Valley.

According to a research, published in The Lancet Planetary Health in January 2021, which estimates the death rate associated with fine particulate matter (PM2.5) and nitrogen dioxide (NO2) pollution in 1000 European cities, Brescia and Bergamo in Lombardy have the highest death rate from fine particulate matter (PM2.5) in Europe. Vicenza (Veneto) and Saronno (Lombardy) are respectively in fourth and eighth place in a top ten of ten cities. Turin and Milan are also at the top of the European ranking – 3rd and 5th respectively – in terms of increased mortality from nitrogen dioxide, a gas that derives mainly from traffic and in particular from diesel vehicles, while Verona, Treviso, Padova, Como and Venice rank eleventh, fourteenth, fifteenth, seventeenth and twentythird respectively. 
 
The data show that many cities in the Po Valley suffer the most serious impact at European level due to poor air quality, first of all the metropolitan area of Milan, thirteenth in the ranking in terms of fine particulate impact, where any year 3967 premature deaths – approximately 9% of the total.

Languages 

Northern Italy is dominated by the Gallo-Italic family of languages, as opposed to the rest of the country where the Italo-Romance languages are spoken, and they include Emilian, Ligurian, Lombard, Piedmontese, and Romagnol. Venetian is also considered to be part of the Gallo-Italic group by most linguists, although others may consider it to be part of Italo-Dalmatian or to constitute a different language family.

The Gallo-Italic languages also reach the north of the Marche region in central Italy (province of Pesaro and Urbino and the city of Senigallia in province of Ancona) and Tuscany (most of the province of Massa-Carrara and the northernmost areas of Garfagnana in the province of Lucca, but also some parts of the Metropolitan City of Florence), so these areas are considered linguistically part of northern Italy.

Other Gallo-Romance languages spoken are Occitan, Arpitan spoken in the Occitan and Arpitan valleys in western Piedmont, and the Rhaeto-Romance group which includes Friulian and Ladin.

Non-Romance languages are also spoken: Germanic languages such as "standard" German and Bavarian in South Tyrol, small Walser communities in Piedmont and Valle d'Aosta, and Cimbrian and mocheno in Veneto, Friuli and Trentino. Slavic languages are spoken in Friuli-Venezia Giulia: there are Slovenian minorities in the province of Trieste and in the eastern parts of those of Udine and Gorizia.

History 
During the Middle Ages, mainly between the thirteenth and fifteenth centuries, an illustrious vulgar was in use, by the name of "Lombard-Venetian koiné". In medieval sources it was simply called "written language" or Lombard, because the toponym "Lombardy" was then used to indicate the entire region of northern Italy.

Starting from the fifteenth century, the Lombard-Venetian koiné began to give ground with respect to the Tuscan, a phenomenon that Tagliavini describes as follows: "Florentine, thanks to (Dante) and other great Tuscans like Petrarch and Boccaccio, to the central position of Florence and to the historical conditions of the time, gradually spread throughout Italy, also resulting in the disappearance of the High-Italian κοινή, which in the thirteenth century had risen to a certain prestige".

This literary koiné manifested itself with authors such as Bonvesin da la Riva, Giacomino da Verona, Uguccione da Lodi, Girardo Patecchio, etc.

Economy

Northern Italy is the most developed and productive area of the country, with one of the highest GDPs per capita in Europe. It was the first part of Italy to become industrialised in the last half of the 19th century; the so-called industrial triangle was formed by the manufacturing centres of Milan and Turin, as well as the seaport of Genoa. Since then, the industrial core of the area has shifted eastward; the current industrial triangle consists of Lombardy, Veneto, and Emilia-Romagna. A similar shift happened for GDP per capita, and the eastern regions (including Lombardy) have since become wealthier than Piedmont and Liguria. With a 2008 nominal GDP estimated at €772,676 Billion, Northern Italy accounts for 54.8% of the Italian economy, despite having just 45.8% of the population.

Largest cities

The most populous cities (with over 100,000 inhabitants) as of July 31, 2021, estimates were:

Alpine regions
Aosta Valley, Piedmont, Veneto, Trentino Alto-Adige, Liguria, Friuli-Venezia-Giulia and Lombardy are known as the Alpine regions of Italy, consisting of all of North Italy except for Emilia-Romagna.

See also
Padanian nationalism
Central Italy
Southern Italy
Italian NUTS level 1 regions

References

Geography of Italy
Regions of Italy
Society of Italy